WNJE (920 AM) is a sports talk radio station in Trenton, New Jersey.  The station is owned by Townsquare Media.

History
This station first operated as WTTM in 1942. It was affiliated with NBC in its early years, eventually shifting to the Mutual Broadcasting System. The station carried varied programming for many years, typically airing general popular music during weekday daytime hours, with Top 40 or rhythm and blues on weeknights and blocks of ethnic programming on weekends. The basic format changed to Top 40 in the late 1970s, followed by country for much of the 1980s and talk in the 1990s.

The WCHR call letters and religious format originated on WTTM's sister station at 94.5 FM in 1969 and remained there for nearly 30 years. After Nassau Broadcasting Partners acquired WCHR, it decided that the powerful FM station had more profit potential as a secular broadcaster, and moved the WCHR call sign and programming to the former WTTM on 920 AM. The switch began with a period of simulcasting that started in November 1997; by the end of February 1998 WCHR was heard on AM only.

The WTTM call sign was subsequently used on a co-owned expanded band AM station licensed to Princeton, which broadcast a sports format with programming from ESPN Radio. In September 2002 the "new" WTTM switched to an Asian format, the WCHR programming and call sign moved to 1040 AM in Flemington, New Jersey and the ESPN programming moved to 920, which adopted the call letters WPHY. Network programming on "920 ESPN" was supplemented with local shows targeting the Philadelphia market, such as Philly Sports Live hosted by Dan Schwartzman and the Reggie Brown (NFL wide receiver) Show.  The station carried play-by-play of the Philadelphia Phillies and some Philadelphia college teams. However, WPHY's signal was inferior in much of the Philadelphia market, limiting the station's impact.

On January 7, 2008, 920 dropped the sports format and returned to WCHR's religious programming as the 1040 facility was converted into WNJE, a simulcast of ESPN Radio's New York City station, WEPN.

The station, along with nine other Nassau stations in New Jersey and Pennsylvania, was purchased at bankruptcy auction by NB Broadcasting in May 2012. NB Broadcasting is controlled by Nassau's creditors — Goldman Sachs, Pluss Enterprises, and P.E. Capital. In November, NB Broadcasting filed a motion to assign its rights to the stations to Connoisseur Media.

On December 3, 2012, WCHR began simulcasting its religious programming on WNJE 1040.

The sale to Connoisseur Media, at a price of $38.7 million, was consummated on May 29, 2013.

On November 1, 2013, the format of 920 was changed to talk radio as "920 The Voice," featuring Premiere Radio Network's Glenn Beck, the syndicated Dave Ramsey show, America Now with Andy Dean and programming from Fox Sports Radio. Christian teaching programming continued to air on 1040, which assumed the WCHR call letters as 1040's former WNJE call sign was moved to 920.

Early in January 2016, WNJE flipped formats to sports talk as "920 The Jersey," carrying much of the program lineup of Fox Sports Radio. The station had been carrying Fox Sports Radio programming in the late night and overnight time periods. From 4-6 PM weekdays, WNJE features the Zach Gelb Show with host Zach Gelb a show that discusses local sports such as the New York and Philadelphia teams. WNJE features paid programming from 6 to 8 p.m. daily and on weekends, with much of the same paid programming carried over from its time as 920 The Voice.

Effective July 2, 2018, Connoisseur Media sold WNJE and sister stations WCHR and WPST to Townsquare Media for $17.3 million.

On September 1, 2020, WNJE rebranded as "920 ESPN New Jersey" and switched affiliations from Fox Sports radio to ESPN Radio.

Previous logo

References

External links

NJE
Sports radio stations in the United States
Townsquare Media radio stations
ESPN Radio stations